The ACB league is one of the top professional basketball leagues in Nicaragua, alongside the Liga Nicaragüense de Baloncesto.

Current clubs

References

External links
Nicaraguan basketball at LatinBasket.com

Videos
Final ACB Tigres vs Tiburones Youtube.com video

Basketball in Nicaragua
Nic